A folktale or folk tale is a folklore genre that typically consists of a story passed down from generation to generation orally.

Folktale may also refer to:

Categories of stories
 Folkloric tale from oral tradition
 Fable (written form of the above)
 Fairy tales 
 Folklore in general
 Old wives' tale

Specific works
 A Folk Tale, an 1854 ballet by Danish choreographer August Bournonville
 Folk Tale (album), a 2011 album by Christy Moore
 Folktales (album), a 2000 studio album by the band The Big Wu
 Hungarian Folktales (TV series), a Hungarian animated series based on Hungarian folk tales
 Folktales, a nationally syndicated folk music radio show in the United States produced by WBOI